Clark County is a county located in the U.S. state of Missouri. As of the 2020 census, its population was 6,634.  Its county seat is Kahoka. The county was organized December 16, 1836 and named for William Clark, leader of the Lewis and Clark Expedition and later Governor of Missouri Territory.

Clark County is part of the Fort Madison–Keokuk, IA-IL-MO Micropolitan Statistical Area.

History
Missouri folklorist Margot Ford McMillen wrote that early settlers were attracted by Clark County's good and inexpensive agricultural land. One section was called "Bit Nation" because land was sold there for just twelve and one-half cents ("one bit" of a Spanish dollar) an acre.

Geography

Adjacent counties
Van Buren County, Iowa (north)
Lee County, Iowa (northeast)
Hancock County, Illinois (east)
Lewis County (south)
Knox County (southwest)
Scotland County (west)

Major highways
 U.S. Route 61
 U.S. Route 136
 Route 27
 Route 81

National protected area
Great River National Wildlife Refuge (part)

Demographics

As of the census of 2010, there were 7,139 people, 2,966 households, and 2,079 families residing in the county.  The population density was 15 people per square mile (6/km2).  There were 3,483 housing units at an average density of 7 per square mile (3/km2).  The racial makeup of the county was 98.83% White, 0.07% Black or African American, 0.20% Native American, 0.07% Asian, 0.01% Pacific Islander, 0.22% from other races, and 0.61% from two or more races. Approximately 0.70% of the population were Hispanic or Latino of any race.

There were 2,966 households, out of which 30.30% had children under the age of 18 living with them, 58.70% were married couples living together, 7.00% had a female householder with no husband present, and 29.90% were non-families. 26.40% of all households were made up of individuals, and 13.60% had someone living alone who was 65 years of age or older.  The average household size was 2.46 and the average family size was 2.95.

In the county, the population was spread out, with 25.00% under the age of 18, 7.80% from 18 to 24, 25.50% from 25 to 44, 25.00% from 45 to 64, and 16.70% who were 65 years of age or older.  The median age was 39 years. For every 100 females, there were 97.60 males.  For every 100 females age 18 and over, there were 94.00 males.

The median income for a household in the county was $29,457, and the median income for a family was $36,270. Males had a median income of $27,279 versus $19,917 for females. The per capita income for the county was $15,988.  About 10.80% of families and 14.10% of the population were below the poverty line, including 19.70% of those under age 18 and 12.70% of those age 65 or over.

2020 Census

Education

Public schools
Clark County R-I School District – Kahoka
Running Fox Elementary School (PK-05)
Black Hawk Elementary School (K-05)
Clark County Middle School (06-08)
Clark County High School (09-12)

Private schools
Shiloh Christian School – Kahoka (03-12) – Nondenominational Christianity

Public libraries
Northeast Missouri Library Service

Politics

Local
The Republican Party controls politics at the local level in Clark County. As of 2018, Republicans hold nine of fourteen of the elected positions in the county.

State

All of Clark County is included in Missouri's 4th District in the Missouri House of Representatives and is represented by  Craig Redmon (R-Canton).

All of Clark County is a part of Missouri's 18th District in the Missouri Senate and is currently represented by Cindy O'Laughlin (R-Shelbina).

Federal

All of Clark County is included in Missouri's 6th Congressional District and is currently represented by Sam Graves (R-Tarkio) in the U.S. House of Representatives.

Communities

Cities
Alexandria
Kahoka (county seat)
Revere
Wayland
Wyaconda

Villages
Luray

Census-designated places
Medill
St. Francisville

Other unincorporated places

 Acasto
 Anson
 Antioch
 Ashton
 Athens
 Chambersburg
 Clark City
 Dumas
 Fairmont
 Gregory Landing
 Neeper
 Peaksville  
 St. Patrick
 Union
 Waterloo
 Winchester

Townships (all inactive)

 Clay
 Des Moines
 Folker
 Grant
 Jackson
 Jefferson
 Lincoln
 Madison
 Sweet Home
 Union
 Vernon
 Washington
 Wyaconda

See also
National Register of Historic Places listings in Clark County, Missouri

References

External links
  "Guide to Clark County Missouri" records 
 Digitized 1930 Plat Book of Clark County  from University of Missouri Division of Special Collections, Archives, and Rare Books

 
Missouri counties
Missouri counties on the Mississippi River
Fort Madison–Keokuk, IA-IL-MO Micropolitan Statistical Area
1836 establishments in Missouri
Populated places established in 1836